Bryan Norrie (born 14 October 1983) is an Australian former professional rugby league footballer who played in the 2000s and 2010s. He  played for National Rugby League clubs the Melbourne Storm,  Cronulla-Sutherland Sharks, St George Illawarra Dragons and Penrith Panthers.

Early life
Born in Forbes, New South Wales. Norrie  was educated at Yanco Agricultural High School, and represented the 2001 Australian Schoolboys in three test matches against Great Britain.

Norrie also represented his school in the Buckley Shield, Riverina Cup, Nutrigrain Cup, and University Shield. In 2000 and 2001 he was selected for Open boys Riverina and Southern teams. In 2001 Norrie was selected in the state schoolboys side.

Professional playing career
Norrie made his NRL debut for the St George Illawarra Dragons in 2004. The Penrith Panthers contracted Norrie for 2 years between 2006 and 2007, prior to his 2-year tenure with the Cronulla-Sutherland Sharks in 2008-09.

Melbourne Storm signed Norrie in early 2010 and he later became a member of the Storm leadership group. He played in Storm's 2012 NRL Grand Final victory against the Canterbury-Bankstown Bulldogs and their 2013 World Club Challenge victory over Leeds.

On 10 October 2014, Norrie announced his retirement from rugby league after receiving medical advice as a result of a neck injury.

Later years
Norrie became an Australian Apprenticeships Ambassador for the Australian Government.

In 2016 he joined the NRL as a match review officer.

References

External links
Cronulla Sharks profile
NRL profile

1983 births
Living people
Australian rugby league players
Melbourne Storm players
Cronulla-Sutherland Sharks players
Penrith Panthers players
St. George Illawarra Dragons players
Rugby league props
Rugby league second-rows
Rugby league players from Forbes, New South Wales